Stand Up For Mental Health (SMH), founded in 2004, is a program based in Vancouver, British Columbia, Canada, in which people who have mental illness (e.g. bipolar disorder, depression, schizophrenia, obsessive compulsive disorder, or post-traumatic stress disorder) are taught stand-up comedy as a form of therapy and then present to the community as a way of addressing the stigma, discrimination, and prejudice surrounding mental health problems. SMH does not consider itself a replacement for medication or conventional therapy, simply as a supplemental way for people with mental illness to feel better about themselves while educating others. The classes are taught by counselor, stand-up comic and author of The Happy Neurotic: How Fear and Angst Can Lead to Happiness and Success, David Granirer who lives with depression. SMH has classes in Halifax, Montreal, Ottawa, Toronto, Guelph, Fort Frances, London (ON), Vancouver, Abbotsford/Chilliwack, Victoria and Courtenay. Famed Canadian comedian Mike MacDonald is a supporter of SMH and performs at many of their shows. Mike MacDonald has bipolar disorder.

Background
David Granirer teaches community members who have a mental illness how to create and perform original comedy material about their mental health journeys. They do shows throughout the course of their 20 classes, then can continue on with SMH in the Alumni Program. The key to the therapeutic aspect of SMH classes is that mental health consumers are able to re-conceptualize their experiences and make light of their own problems, while building self-esteem and a support network. They do not joke about each other's problems but do openly talk about them. They avoid making jokes about sexual abuse, as there is nothing funny about that; although other than that, very little is taboo SMH also does Fighting Stigma in the Workplace and Laughter in the Workplace presentations and workshops for many different companies, government agencies and others. SMH performs across North America at conferences, on military bases, university and college campuses, at mental health facilities, comedy festivals and for the general public.

A CBC Television Passionate Eye Documentary was made about Stand Up for Mental Health, entitled "Cracking Up"  which won a US Government VOICE Award in 2008.

Stand Up for Mental Health piloted several projects in 2009/2010.

 In October 2009, SMH performed on-campus shows for the University of British Columbia, the University of the Fraser Valley, UVic, and Camosun College during Mental Illness Awareness Week. They will be performing in October 2010 at those schools as well as several other universities and colleges including University of Rochester, Dalhousie University, and McGill University.
 In Spring 2010, SMH developed a class for sex workers with mental illness through their partnership with Prostitution Alternatives Counselling & Education (PACE) Society in Vancouver's Downtown Eastside.
 SMH also piloted a lecture/workshop as part of the UBC Faculty of Medicine's 2nd year curriculum (in collaboration with the Island Medical Program - University of Victoria and the Northern Medical Program at UNBC).

SMH hopes to introduce a pre-release program into William Head Institution on Vancouver Island for Corrections Canada. This program will help offenders rebuild self-esteem and gain life-coping skills as they reintegrate into the community.

Early in 2010, SMH received a $50 000 sponsorship from Canada Post who called it a "successful laughter-therapy program".

The organisation is a registered society in the province of British Columbia.

References

External links 
 

Mental health organizations in Canada
Organizations based in Vancouver
Medical and health organizations based in British Columbia